Permanent Vacation is the debut studio album by Australian indie rock duo Lime Cordiale, released on 13 October 2017 through Chugg Music Entertainment.

Background
In an interview with Aus Music Scene, lead vocalist Oliver Leimbach stated:"We want people to find their own stories in this music. I hope you and your lover listen to [album track] "Can I Be Your Lover", break up and then that song makes you suffer. We're trying to get inside your head."

Recording and composition
Permanent Vacation is primarily a pop and rock record. The album was recorded throughout 2017 with producer Dave Hammer. The album discusses themes such as the Australian landscape, conservation and sustainability.

Critical reception
In a review of the album, Tanja Brooks Toubro of Tone Deaf said: "The strength of Permanent Vacation doesn't lie in its ability to present as a perfectly cohesive album – because it doesn't – but in the quality of the individual songs" and described the album as a "very varied record".

Commercial performance
Permanent Vacation debuted and peaked at number 79 on the ARIA Albums Chart for the chart dated 23 October 2017, before falling out of the Top 100 the following week.

Track listing

Personnel
Adapted from the band's official website.

Musicians
Lime Cordiale
 Oliver Leimbach – writing, vocals, guitar 
 Louis Leimbach – vocals, bass guitar, trumpet

Technical
 Dave Hammer – production 
 Brian Lucey – mastering

Artwork
 Louis Leimbach – cover design

Charts

Release history

References

External links
 

2017 debut albums
Lime Cordiale albums
Albums produced by Dave Hammer